Paul Carey may refer to:
Paul Carey (baseball) (born 1968), baseball player
Paul Carey (broadcaster) (1928–2016), American broadcaster and sportscaster
Paul Carey (ice hockey) (born 1988), American ice hockey player
Paul Carey (politician) (1962–2001), White House Special Assistant to U.S. President Bill Clinton
Paul Carey (cricketer) (1920–2009), English cricketer
Paul Carey (hurler) (1978–2020), Irish hurler